Peperomia yabucoana is a species of plant from the genus Peperomia. It is endemic to Puerto Rico. It was discovered by Ignatz Urban and Casimir de Candolle in 1902.

References

yabucoana
Flora of North America
Flora of Puerto Rico
Plants described in 1902
Taxa named by Ignatz Urban
Taxa named by Casimir de Candolle